Johann Jakob Bachofen (22 December 1815 – 25 November 1887) was a Swiss antiquarian, jurist, philologist, anthropologist, and professor for Roman law at the University of Basel from 1841 to 1845.

Bachofen is most often connected with his theories surrounding prehistoric matriarchy, or Das Mutterrecht, the title of his seminal 1861 book Mother Right: an investigation of the religious and juridical character of matriarchy in the Ancient World. Bachofen assembled documentation demonstrating that motherhood is the source of human society, religion, morality, and decorum. He postulated an archaic "mother-right" within the context of a primeval Matriarchal religion or Urreligion.

Bachofen became an important precursor of 20th-century theories of matriarchy, such as the Old European culture postulated by Marija Gimbutas from the 1950s, and the field of feminist theology and "matriarchal studies" in 1970s feminism.

Biography 
Born into a wealthy Basel family active in the silk industry and attended the service of the French Reformed Church in Basel. After having attended the Gymnasium, Bachofen studied in Basel and in Berlin under August Boeckh, Karl Ferdinand Ranke and Friedrich Carl von Savigny as well as in Göttingen. After completing his doctorate in Basel, he studied for another two years in Paris, London and Cambridge. He was called to the Basel chair for Roman law in 1841. In 1842 he travelled to Rome accompanied by his father to according to him, see his spiritual homeland with his own eyes. Having returned to Basel, he was called to the appelate court and his next book on roman law received the acclaim of the academics. He would also become elected into the Grand Council of Basel. He retired from his professorship in 1844, after in the local press it was suggested the wealth of his family would have helped him assume the job at the University. In 1845 he also quit from the Grand Council. As a judge he would stay for twenty-five years and resign after his marriage to Louise Bachofen-Burckhardt. In 1848 he undertook a second journey to Rome in which he witnessed the Roman revolution, changed his research focus from the classical antiquity but the early antiquity. In 1851–1852 he travelled to Greece, Magna Graecia, and Etruria. He published most of his works as a private scholar.

Personal life 

His mother Valeria Merian Bachofen died in 1856 but he kept living in the same house as his father. It was the same house which would become the seat of the Civil Register of Basel between 1962 to 1983 and part of the Antikenmuseum Basel und Sammlung Ludwig in the 1980s. In 1865, he married the at the time twenty five-years old Louise Bachofen-Burckhardt from a noble family of Basel. He would buy a house at the square before the Minster of Basel and a son was born. Louise Bachofen Burckhardt would live in the house at the Minster Square after her husband would die in 1877. Johann Jakob Bachofen is buried at the Wolfgottesacker cemetery in Basel. The tomb was sculptured by Richard Kissling.

Das Mutterrecht 

Bachofen's 1861 Das Mutterrecht proposed four phases of cultural evolution which absorbed each other:
 Hetaerism: a wild nomadic 'tellurian' [= chthonic or earth-centered] phase, characterised by him as communistic and polyamorous, whose dominant deity he believed to have been an earthy proto Aphrodite.
 Das Mutterecht: a matriarchal 'lunar' phase based on agriculture, characterised by him by the emergence of chthonic mystery cults and law. Its dominant deity was an early Demeter.
 The Dionysian: a transitional phase when earlier traditions were masculinised as patriarchy began to emerge. Its dominant deity was the original Dionysos.
 The Apollonian: the patriarchal 'solar' phase, in which all trace of the Matriarchal and Dionysian past was eradicated and modern civilisation emerged.

Reception 

There was little initial reaction to Bachofen’s theory of cultural evolution, largely because of his impenetrable literary style, but eventually, along with furious criticism, the book inspired several generations of ethnologists, social philosophers, and even writers: Lewis Henry Morgan; Friedrich Engels, who drew on Bachofen for The Origin of the Family, Private Property and the State; Thomas Mann; Jane Ellen Harrison, who was inspired by Bachofen to devote her career to mythology; Walter Benjamin; Carl Jung; Erich Fromm; Robert Graves; Rainer Maria Rilke; Joseph Campbell; Otto Gross; Erich Neumann and opponents such as Julius Evola.  In 1930s his work was acclaimed by several prominent academics in the German speaking world. 

Friedrich Engels analysed Bachofen's views as follows:
"(1) That originally man lived in a state of sexual promiscuity, to describe which Bachofen uses the mistaken term "hetaerism";
(2) that such promiscuity excludes any certainty of paternity, and that descent could therefore be reckoned only in the female line, according to mother-right, and that this was originally the case amongst all the peoples of antiquity;
(3) that since women, as mothers, were the only parents of the younger generation that were known with certainty, they held a position of such high respect and honor that it became the foundation, in Bachofen's conception, of a regular rule of women (gynaecocracy);
(4) that the transition to monogamy, where the woman belonged to one man exclusively, involved a violation of a primitive religious law (that is, actually a violation of the traditional right of the other men to this woman), and that in order to expiate this violation or to purchase indulgence for it the woman had to surrender herself for a limited period."  (Friedrich Engels, 1891: see link below)

Emile Durkheim credited Bachofen with upsetting the "old conception" that the father must be "the essential element of the family". Before Bachofen, Durkheim claims that "no one had dreamed that there could be a family organization of which the paternal authority was not the keystone".

Bachofen's actual writings are that matriarchy originated as a rebellion against promiscuity, because of the sexual strains it caused them, to institute matriarchy and monogamy.

As has been noted by Joseph Campbell in Occidental Mythology and others, Bachofen's theories stand in radical opposition to the Aryan origin theories of religion, culture and society, and both Campbell and writers such as Evola have suggested that Bachofen's theories only adequately explain the development of religion among the pre-Aryan cultures of the Mediterranean and the Levant, and possibly Southern Asia, but that a separate, patriarchal development existed among the Aryan tribes which conquered Europe and parts of Asia.

Engels said that Bachofen had proved his theory that Matriarchy was promiscuous, but Bachofen, argued the opposite, that Matriarchy introduced monogamy.

Works 
 De legis actionibus de formulis et de condictione. Dissertation Basel. Dieterich, Göttingen 1840.
 Das Naturrecht und das geschichtliche Recht in ihren Gegensätzen. Basel 1841. reprint: Off. Librorum, Lauterbach 1995, 
 Römisches Pfandrecht. Schweighauser, Basel 1847. reprint: Keip, Goldbach 1997, 
 Ausgewählte Lehren des römischen Civilrechts. Leipzig 1848. reprint: Keip, Goldbach 1997, 
 Versuch über die Gräbersymbolik der Alten. Basel 1859
 Oknos der Seilflechter : ein Grabbild : Erlösungsgedanken antiker Gräbersymbolik. Basel 1859. reprint: Beck, München 1923
 Das Mutterrecht: eine Untersuchung über die Gynaikokratie der alten Welt nach ihrer religiösen und rechtlichen Natur. Stuttgart: Verlag von Krais und Hoffmann, 1861 ( Internet Archive link)
 abbreviated edition, ed.  Hans-Jürgen Heinrichs. (Suhrkamp Taschenbücher Wissenschaft; Nr.135.) Frankfurt am Main: Suhrkamp, 1975 
 excerpts edited as Mutterrecht und Urreligion: eine Auswahl, ed. Rudolf Marx. (Kröners Taschenausgabe; Band 52) Leipzig: A. Kröner, 1927; Stuttgart, 1954; 6th ed. 1984 .
 Antiquarische Briefe vornemlich zur Kenntniss der ältesten Verwandtschaftsbegriffe. 2 vols. Trübner, Strassburg 1880 & 1886.
 Römische Grablampen nebst einigen andern Grabdenkmälern vorzugsweise eigener Sammlung. Basel 1890
 Gesammelte Werke (collected works) ed.  Karl Meuli. Basel: B. Schwabe, 1943–1967, in 8 volumes (I-IV, VI-VIII and X)
 I. Antrittsrede; politische Betrachtungen
 II. Das Mutterecht, erste Hälfte
 III. Das Mutterecht, zweite Hälfte
 IV. Die Sage von Tanaquil
 VII. Die Unsterblichkeitslehre der orphanischen Theologie: Römische Grablampen
 VIII. Antiquarische Briefe
 X. Briefe
 Myth, Religion and Mother Right Princeton University Press, translated by Ralph Manheim, 1967  
 An English Translation of Bachofen's Mutterrecht (Mother Right) (1861): A Study of the Religious and Juridical Aspects of Gynecocracy in the Ancient World Volumes 1-5:
 Vol 1. "Lycia," "Crete," and "Athens" Lewiston, NY: Edwin Mellen, translated by David Partenheimer, 30 January 2008  
 Vol 2. "Lemnos" and "Egypt" Lewiston, NY: Edwin Mellen, translated by David Partenheimer, 1 April 2007 
 Vol 3. Orchomenus And the Minyan's And India And Central Asia Lewiston, NY: Edwin Mellen, translated by David Partenheimer, 30 June 2006 
 Vol 4. "Elis", "The Epizephyrian Locrians", and "Lesbos" Lewiston, NY: Edwin Mellen, translated by David Partenheimer, 1 June 2005,  
 Vol 5. Mantinea; Pythagoreanism and Subsequent Doctrines; The Cantabri; Lewiston, NY: Edwin Mellen, translated by David Partenheimer, 1 January 2003

See also 
 List of important publications in anthropology
 James Frazer
 René Girard
 Robert Graves
 Matriarchal religion
 Margaret Murray
 Potnia theron

References

Further reading 
 Lullies, Reinhard & Schiering, Wolfgang (1988) Archäologenbildnisse: Porträts und Kurzbiographien von Klassischen Archäologen deutscher Sprache. Mainz: Verlag Philipp von Zabern; pp. 41–42
 Gender-Killer, A. G. (ed.) (2005) Antisemitismus und Geschlecht: von „effeminierten Juden“, „maskulinisierten Jüdinnen“ und anderen Geschlechterbildern. Münster: Unrast-Verlag 
 Wesel, Uwe (1980) Der Mythos vom Matriarchat: über Bachofens Mutterrecht und die Stellung von Frauen in frühen Gesellschaften vor der Entstehung staatlicher Herrschaft. Frankfurt am Main: Suhrkamp
 Gossmann, Lionel (1984) "Basle, Bachofen and the Critique of Modernity in the Second Half of the Nineteenth Century", in: Journal of the Warburg and Courtauld Institutes; 47, pp. 136–185
 Gossman, Lionel. “Orpheus Philologus: Bachofen versus Mommsen on the Study of Antiquity.” American Philosophical Society, 1983.  .
 Lionel Gossman, Basel in the Age of Burckhardt: A Study in Unseasonable Ideas (Chicago: University of Chicago Press, 2000), 109-200. 
 Wiedemann, Felix (2007) Rassenmutter und Rebellin: Hexenbilder in Romantik, völkischer Bewegung, Neuheidentum und Feminismus. Würzburg: Königshausen & Neumann .
 Rattner, Josef & Danzer, Gerhard (2003) "Johann Jakob Bachofen und die Mutterrechtstheorie", pp. 9–28 in: Europäische Kulturbeiträge im deutsch-schweizerischen Schrifttum von 1850-2000. Würzburg: Königshausen & Neumann

External links 
 Johann Jakob Bachofen Explorer of the Mother Right

1815 births
1887 deaths
Swiss anthropologists
Swiss sociologists
Swiss philosophers
Men and feminism
Matriarchy